Zebra is one of several species of the horse genus Equus whose members have distinctive stripes.

Zebra may also refer to:

Entertainment

Music
 Zebra (American band), a hard rock/heavy metal group from 1975 to the present
 Zebra (Yugoslav band), a rock band from 1976 to 1979
 "Zebra" (Beach House song), a 2010 song by American dream pop band Beach House
 "Zebra" (The John Butler Trio song), a 2003 song by The John Butler Trio
 Zebra (Jack DeJohnette album), 1989 album by jazz musician Jack DeJohnette
 Zebra (Kayah album), a 1995 album by Polish singer Kayah
 Zebra (Morandi album), expected from the Romanian Europop group
 Zebra (Yello album), 1994 electronica album
 Zebra (Zebra album), their 1983 album
 Zebra Records, a record label

Other entertainment
 Zebra (chess), a fairy chess piece
 Zebra (Pearls Before Swine), a comic strip character

Technology
 ZEBRA (computer), an early Dutch computer
 Zebra (programming language), a printer description language
 GNU Zebra, a network routing software package
 Zebra battery, a type of molten salt battery

Transportation
 Zebra (ship) a three-masted merchant ship, built in 1818
 HMS Zebra, the name of six ships of the Royal Navy
 USS Zebra (AKN-5), a cargo ship of the United States Navy
 Daihatsu Zebra, a compact commercial vehicle
 ZAP Xebra, a light electric vehicle

Other
 Zebra (medicine), American medical slang for an obscure and unlikely diagnosis
 Zebra (pen manufacturer), a Japanese manufacturer of writing instrument
 Zebra Books, an imprint of Kensington Books
 Zebra Technologies, American manufacturer of marking, tracking, and computer printing technologies
 Zebra murders, a string of racially motivated murders in San Francisco, California between 1973 and 1974
 ZEBRA protein, of the Epstein-Barr virus
 Zebra Puzzle, a logic puzzle

See also
 Zebra Man (disambiguation)
 Zebra stripe (disambiguation)
 Zebrafish (disambiguation)